Carlos Alberto "Beto" Richa (born June 29, 1965) is a Brazilian engineer and politician. He was the Governor of the Brazilian state of Paraná until April 6, 2018, when he resigned to run for a seat at the Brazilian Senate. He was succeeded by Cida Borghetti.
On September 11, 2018, less than a month to the election, Richa was arrested as part of the Operation Car Wash.

References

1965 births
Mayors of Curitiba
Governors of Paraná (state)
Living people
People from Londrina
Brazilian people of Arab descent
Pontifical Catholic University of Paraná alumni
Members of the Legislative Assembly of Paraná